Conversion therapy is the pseudoscientific practice of attempting to change an individual's sexual orientation, gender identity, or gender expression to align with heterosexual and cisgender norms. Methods that have been used to this end include forms of brain surgery, surgical or hormonal castration, aversive treatments such as electric shocks, nausea-inducing drugs, hypnosis, counseling, spiritual interventions, visualization, psychoanalysis, and  masturbatory reconditioning.

There is a scientific consensus that conversion therapy is ineffective at changing a person's sexual orientation or gender identity and that it frequently causes significant, long-term psychological harm in individuals who undergo it. The position of current evidence-based medicine and clinical guidance is that homosexuality, bisexuality and gender variance are natural and healthy aspects of human sexuality. Historically, conversion therapy was the treatment of choice for individuals who disclosed same-sex attractions or exhibited gender nonconformity, which were formerly assumed to be pathologies by the medical establishment. 

An increasing number of jurisdictions around the world have passed laws against conversion therapy. Conversion therapy may constitute fraud and when performed on minors, a form of child abuse; it has been described by experts as torture, cruel, inhuman, or degrading treatment, and contrary to human rights.

Terminology 
Medical professionals and activists consider "conversion therapy" a misnomer, as it does not constitute a legitimate form of therapy.  Alternative terms include sexual orientation change efforts (SOCE), gender identity change efforts (GICE)—together, sexual orientation and gender identity change efforts (SOGICE). According to researcher Douglas C. Haldeman, SOCE and GICE should be considered together because both rest on the assumption "that gender-related behavior consistent with the individual’s birth sex is normative and anything else is unacceptable and should be changed". "Reparative therapy" may refer to conversion therapy in general, or to a subset thereof.

History

Sexual orientation change efforts (SOCE) 
The term homosexual was coined by German-speaking Hungarian writer Karl Maria Kertbeny and was in circulation by the 1880s. Into the middle of the twentieth century, competing views of homosexuality were advanced by psychoanalysis versus academic sexology. Sigmund Freud, the founder of psychoanalysis, viewed homosexuality as a form of arrested development. Later psychoanalysts followed Sandor Rado, who argued that homosexuality was a "phobic avoidance of heterosexuality caused by inadequate early parenting". This line of thinking was popular in psychiatric models of homosexuality based on the prison population or homosexuals seeking treatment. In contrast, sexology researchers such as Alfred Kinsey argued that homosexuality was a normal variation in human development. In 1970, gay activists confronted the American Psychiatric Association, persuading the association to reconsider whether homosexuality should be listed as a disorder. The APA delisted homosexuality in 1973, which contributed to shifts in public opinion on homosexuality.

Despite their lack of scientific backing, some socially or religiously conservative activists continued to argue that if one person's sexuality could be changed, homosexuality was not a fixed class such as race. Borrowing from discredited psychoanalytic ideas about the cause of homosexuality, some of these individuals offered conversion therapy. In 2001, conversion therapy attracted attention when Robert L. Spitzer published a non-peer-reviewed study asserting that some homosexuals could change their sexual orientation. Many researchers made methodological criticisms of the study, which Spitzer later repudiated.

Gender identity change efforts (GICE) 
Gender Identity Change Efforts (GICE) refer to practices of healthcare providers and religious counselors with the goal of attempting to alter a person's gender identity or expression to conform to social norms. Examples include aversion therapy, cognitive restructuring, and psychoanalytic and talk therapies. Western medical-model narratives have historically institutionalized transphobia: systemically favoring a binary gender model and pathologizing gender diversity and non-conformity.  This aided the development and proliferation of GICE.

Early interventions were rooted in psychoanalytic hypotheses. Robert Stoller advanced the theory that gender-nonconforming behavior and expression in children assigned male at birth (AMAB) was caused by being overly close to their mother. Richard Green continued his research; his methods for altering behavior included having the father spend more time with the child and mother less, expecting both to exhibit stereotypical gender roles, and having them praise their child's masculine behaviors, and shame their feminine and gender-nonconforming ones. These interventions resulted in depression in the children and feelings of betrayal from parents that the treatments failed.

Kenneth Zucker at CAMH adopted Richard Green's methods, but narrowed the scope to attempting to prevent the child from identifying as transgender. His model used the same interventions as Green with the addition of psychodynamic therapy. In 2015, an Ontario law was passed making conversion therapy illegal to provide to minors, and removing it from public health insurance coverage for adults. As a result of the law, Zucker's clinic was shut down, and he was fired.

Some clinicians have begun using "gender exploratory therapy" as an alternative to gender-affirming approaches for youth with gender dysphoria. Gender exploratory therapy uses talk therapy in an attempt to find pathological roots for gender dysphoria. In a September 2022 review of gender exploratory therapy, bioethicist Florence Ashley found strong similarities to conversion practices.

Motivations
A frequent motivation for adults who pursue conversion therapy is their religious beliefs, especially evangelical Christianity and Orthodox Judaism, that disapprove of same-sex relations. These adults prioritize maintaining a good relationship with their family and religious community. Adolescents who are pressured by their families into undergoing conversion therapy also typically come from a conservative religious background. Youth from families with low socioeconomic status are also more likely to undergo conversion therapy.

Theories and techniques
As societal attitudes toward homosexuality have become more tolerant over time, the most harsh conversion therapy methods such as aversion have been reduced. Secular conversion therapy is offered less often due to reduced medical pathologization of homosexuality, and religious practitioners have become more dominant.

Aversion therapy

Aversion therapy used on homosexuals included electric shock and nausea-inducing drugs during presentation of same-sex erotic images. Cessation of the aversive stimuli was typically accompanied by the presentation of opposite-sex erotic images, with the objective of strengthening heterosexual feelings. Another method used was the covert sensitization method, which involves instructing patients to imagine vomiting or receiving electric shocks, writing that only single case studies have been conducted, and that their results cannot be generalized. Haldeman writes that behavioral conditioning studies tend to decrease homosexual feelings, but do not increase heterosexual feelings, citing Rangaswami's "Difficulties in arousing and increasing heterosexual responsiveness in a homosexual: A case report", published in 1982, as typical in this respect.

Aversion therapy was developed in Czechoslovakia between 1950 and 1962 and in the Commonwealth from 1961 into the mid-1970s. In the context of the Cold War, Western psychologists ignored the poor results of their Czechoslovak counterparts, who had concluded that aversion therapy was not effective by 1961 and recommended decriminalization of homosexuality instead. Some men in the United Kingdom were offered the choice between prison and undergoing aversion therapy. It was also offered to a few British women, but was never the standard treatment for either homosexual men or women.

Brain surgery

In the 1940s and 1950s, U.S. neurologist Walter Freeman popularized the ice-pick lobotomy as a treatment for homosexuality. He personally performed as many as 3,439 lobotomy surgeries in 23 states, of which 2,500 used his ice-pick procedure, despite the fact that he had no formal surgical training.

Castration and transplantation

In early twentieth century Germany experiments were carried out in which homosexual men were subjected to unilateral orchiectomy  and testicles of heterosexual men were transplanted. These operations were a complete failure. 

Surgical castration of homosexual men was widespread in Europe in the first half of the twentieth century and was also practiced in the United States. SS leader Heinrich Himmler ordered homosexual men to be sent to concentration camps because he did not consider a time-limited prison sentence was sufficient to eliminate homosexuality. Although theoretically voluntary, some homosexuals were subject to severe pressure and coercion to agree to castration. There was no age limit; some boys as young as 16 were castrated. Those who agreed to castration after a Paragraph 175 conviction were exempted from being transferred to a concentration camp after completing their legal sentence. Some concentration camp prisoners were also subjected to castration. An estimated 400 to 800 men were castrated.

Endocrinologist Carl Vaernet attempted to change homosexual concentration camp prisoners' sexual orientations by implanting a pellet that released testosterone. Most of the victims, non-consenting prisoners at Buchenwald, died shortly thereafter.

An unknown number of men were castrated in West Germany and chemical castration was used in other Western countries, notably against Alan Turing in the United Kingdom.

Ex-gay/ex-trans ministry

Some sources describe ex-gay and ex-trans ministries as a form of conversion therapy, while others state that ex-gay organizations and conversion therapy are distinct methods of attempting to convert gay people to heterosexuality. The umbrella organization Exodus International in the United States ceased activities in June 2013, and the three member board issued a statement which repudiated its aims and apologized for the harm their pursuit has caused to LGBT people. Ex-gay/ex-trans organizations often overlap and portray being trans as inherently sinful or against God's design, or pathologize gender variance as due to trauma, social contagion, or "gender ideology."

Hypnosis 
Hypnosis was used in conversion therapy since the 19th century by Richard von Krafft-Ebing and Albert von Schrenck-Notzing. In 1967, Canadian psychiatrist Peter Roper published a case study of treating 15 homosexuals (some of which would probably be considered bisexuals by modern standards) with hypnosis. Allegedly, 8 showed "marked improvement" (they reportedly lost sexual attraction towards the same sex altogether), 4 mild improvements (decrease of "homosexual tendencies"), and 3 no improvement after hypnotic treatment; he concluded that "hypnosis may well produce more satisfactory results than those obtainable by other means", depending on the hypnotic susceptibility of the subjects.

Psychoanalysis

Haldeman writes that psychoanalytic treatment of homosexuality is exemplified by the work of Irving Bieber et al. in Homosexuality: A Psychoanalytic Study of Male Homosexuals. They advocated long-term therapy aimed at resolving the unconscious childhood conflicts that they considered responsible for homosexuality. Haldeman notes that Bieber's methodology has been criticized because it relied upon a clinical sample, the description of the outcomes was based upon subjective therapist impression, and follow-up data were poorly presented. Bieber reported a 27% success rate from long-term therapy, but only 18% of the patients in whom Bieber considered the treatment successful had been exclusively homosexual to begin with, while 50% had been bisexual. In Haldeman's view, this makes even Bieber's unimpressive claims of success misleading.

Haldeman discusses other psychoanalytic studies of attempts to change homosexuality. Curran and Parr's "Homosexuality: An analysis of 100 male cases", published in 1957, reported no significant increase in heterosexual behavior. Mayerson and Lief's "Psychotherapy of homosexuals: A follow-up study of nineteen cases", published in 1965, reported that half of its 19 subjects were exclusively heterosexual in behavior four and a half years after treatment, but its outcomes were based on patient self-report and had no external validation. In Haldeman's view, those participants in the study who reported change were bisexual at the outset, and its authors wrongly interpreted capacity for heterosexual sex as change of sexual orientation.

Reparative therapy

The term "reparative therapy" has been used as a synonym for conversion therapy generally, but according to Jack Drescher it properly refers to a specific kind of therapy associated with the psychologists Elizabeth Moberly and Joseph Nicolosi. The term reparative refers to Nicolosi's postulate that same-sex attraction is a person's unconscious attempt to "self-repair" feelings of inferiority.

Marriage therapy

Previous editions of the World Health Organization's ICD included "sexual relationship disorder", in which a person's sexual orientation or gender identity makes it difficult to form or maintain a relationship with a sexual partner. The belief that their sexual orientation has caused problems in their relationship may lead some people to turn to a marriage therapist for help to change their sexual orientation. Sexual orientation disorder was removed from the most recent ICD, ICD-11, after the Working Group on Sexual Disorders and Sexual Health determined that its inclusion was unjustified.

Effects

There is a scientific consensus that conversion therapy is ineffective at changing a person's sexual orientation. Advocates of conversion therapy rely heavily on testimonials and retrospective self-reports as evidence of effectiveness. Studies purporting to validate the effectiveness of efforts to change sexual orientation or gender identity have been criticized for methodological flaws. After conversion therapy has failed to change someone's sexual orientation or gender identity, participants often feel increased shame that they already felt over their sexual orientation or gender identity. 

Conversion therapy can cause significant, long-term psychological harm. This includes significantly higher rates of depression, substance abuse, and other mental health issues in individuals who have undergone conversion therapy than their peers who did not, including a suicide attempt rate nearly twice that of those who did not. Modern-day practitioners of conversion therapy—primarily from a conservative religious viewpoint—disagree with current evidence-based medicine and clinical guidance that does not view homosexuality and gender variance as unnatural or unhealthy.

A 2022 study estimated that conversion therapy of youth in the United States cost $650.16 million annually with an additional $9.5 billion in associated costs such as increased suicide and substance abuse. Youth who undergo conversion therapy from a religious provider have more negative mental health outcomes than those who had consulted a licensed healthcare provider.

Public opinion
A 2020 survey carried out on US adults found majority support for banning conversion therapy for minors.

A 2022 YouGov poll found majority support in England, Scotland, and Wales for a conversion therapy ban for both sexual orientation and gender identity, with opposition ranging from 13 to 15 percent.

Legal status

Some jurisdictions have criminal bans on the practice of conversion therapy, including Malta, Spain, France, Germany, Albania, Mexico and Canada. In other countries, including Brazil, Ecuador, and Taiwan, medical professionals are barred from practicing conversion therapy.

In some states, lawsuits against conversion therapy providers for fraud have succeeded, but in other jurisdictions those claiming fraud must prove that the perpetrator was intentionally dishonest. Thus, a provider who genuinely believes conversion therapy is effective could not be convicted.

Conversion therapy on minors may amount to child abuse.

Human rights
In 2020 the International Rehabilitation Council for Torture Victims released an official statement that conversion therapy is torture. The same year, UN Independent Expert on sexual orientation and gender identity, Victor Madrigal-Borloz, said that conversion therapy practices are "inherently discriminatory, that they are cruel, inhuman and degrading treatment, and that depending on the severity or physical or mental pain and suffering inflicted to the victim, they may amount to torture". He recommended that it should be banned across the world. In 2021 Ilias Trispiotis and Craig Purshouse argue that conversion therapy violates the prohibition against degrading treatment under Article 3 of the European Convention on Human Rights, leading to a state obligation to prohibit it.

Medical views
Many health organizations around the world have denounced and criticized sexual orientation and gender identity change efforts. National health organizations in the United States have announced that there has been no scientific demonstration of conversion therapy's efficacy in the last forty years. They find that conversion therapy is ineffective, risky and can be harmful. Anecdotal claims of cures are counterbalanced by assertions of harm, and the American Psychiatric Association, for example, cautions ethical practitioners under the Hippocratic oath to do no harm and to refrain from attempts at conversion therapy.

Mainstream medical bodies state that conversion therapy can be harmful because it may exploit guilt and anxiety, thereby damaging self-esteem and leading to depression and even suicide. There is also concern in the mental health community that the advancement of conversion therapy can cause social harm by disseminating inaccurate views about gender identity, sexual orientation, and the ability of LGBTQ people to lead happy, healthy lives.

Some medical bodies prohibit their members from practicing conversion therapy.

See also 

 Christianity and homosexuality
 Recovering from Religion

References

Bibliography

Further reading

 
Gender identity
Human rights abuses
Medical controversies
Pseudoscience
Religion and mental health
Religion and science
Sexual orientation and medicine
Violence against LGBT people